Sir John Hobart, 2nd Baronet (19 April 1593 – 20 April 1647) was an English politician and baronet.

Background
Born in Norwich, he was the eldest son of Sir Henry Hobart, 1st Baronet, and his wife Dorothy Bell, daughter of Sir Robert Bell. Hobart was knighted at Whitehall on 10 November 1611, and succeeded his father as baronet in 1625.

Career
Hobart was Member of Parliament for Cambridge in 1621, Lostwithiel from 1624 to 1625 and Brackley in 1626. He then returned to the Long Parliament for Norfolk in 1645, a seat he held until his death in 1647.

He was Justice of the Peace for Middlesex from 1624 to 1629 and for Norfolk from 1625 to his death, and was appointed High Sheriff of Norfolk for 1632–33.

He completed the building of Blickling Hall, a major Jacobean country house.

Family
He married firstly in July 1614 Lady Philippa Sidney, a daughter of Robert Sidney, 1st Earl of Leicester. They had a daughter. Philippa died in 1620. and Hobart married secondly Lady Frances Egerton, eldest daughter of John Egerton, 1st Earl of Bridgwater in February 1621, and had by her of nine children an only surviving daughter. He died, aged 54, in Norwich after a long illness and was buried in Blickling in Norfolk nine days later. Hobart was succeeded in the baronetcy by his nephew John.

References

1593 births
1647 deaths
Baronets in the Baronetage of England
High Sheriffs of Norfolk
John
Members of the pre-1707 English Parliament for constituencies in Cornwall
English MPs 1621–1622
English MPs 1624–1625
English MPs 1626
English MPs 1640–1648
Politicians from Norwich
People from Blickling
Members of Parliament for Norfolk